Ivan Alekseevich Bessonov (born July 24, 2002, Saint Petersburg, Russia) is a Russian pianist and composer, winner of the Eurovision Young Musicians 2018.

He composes music and made his film debut as a composer in 2015. He gives solo concerts in Russia and abroad (Austria, Germany, Italy, etc.), collaborates with the world's leading conductors — Valery Gergiev, Vladimir Spivakov, Alexander Sladkovsky. 

In 2019, he was the spokesperson of the Russian jury's voting at the Eurovision Song Contest 2019.

In 2022, Bessonov achieved the First Prize in the first edition of the S. V. Rachmaninoff Competition in the Piano category.

References

External links

 Bessonov   Brothers official website
 Что общего у музыки с ветрянкой? 15-летний пианист о Моцарте и футболе

2002 births
Living people
Musicians from Saint Petersburg
Russian classical pianists
Male classical pianists
21st-century pianists
Russian film score composers
Winners of Eurovision Young Musicians
21st-century Russian male musicians